The UEFA Champions League (abbreviated as UCL, or sometimes, UEFA CL) is an annual club football competition organised by the Union of European Football Associations (UEFA) and contested by top-division European clubs, deciding the competition winners through a round robin group stage to qualify for a double-legged knockout format, and a single leg final. It is one of the most prestigious football tournaments in the world and the most prestigious club competition in European football, played by the national league champions (and, for some nations, one or more runners-up) of their national associations.

The competition took on its current name in 1992, adding a round-robin group stage in 1991 and allowing multiple entrants from certain countries since the 1997–98 season. It has since been expanded, and while most of Europe's national leagues can still only enter their champion, the strongest leagues now provide up to four teams. Clubs that finish next-in-line in their national league, having not qualified for the Champions League, are eligible for the second-tier UEFA Europa League competition, and since 2021, for the third-tier UEFA Europa Conference League.

In its present format, the Champions League begins in late June with a preliminary round, three qualifying rounds and a play-off round, all played over two legs. The six surviving teams enter the group stage, joining 26 teams qualified in advance. The 32 teams are drawn into eight groups of four teams and play each other in a double round-robin system. The eight group winners and eight runners-up proceed to the knockout phase that culminates with the final match in late May or early June. The winner of the Champions League qualifies for the following year's Champions League, the UEFA Super Cup, and the FIFA Club World Cup.

Spanish clubs have the highest number of victories (19 wins), followed by England (14 wins) and Italy (12 wins). England has the largest number of winning teams, with five clubs having won the title. The competition has been won by 22 clubs, 13 of which have won it more than once, and eight successfully defended their title. Real Madrid is the most successful club in the tournament's history, having won it 14 times, including the first five seasons and also five of the last nine. Only one club has won all of their matches in a single tournament en route to the tournament victory: Bayern Munich in the 2019–20 season. Real Madrid are the current European champions, having beaten Liverpool 1–0 in the 2022 final.

History

The first time the champions of two European leagues met was in what was nicknamed the 1895 World Championship, when English champions Sunderland beat Scottish champions Hearts 5–3. The first pan-European tournament was the Challenge Cup, a competition between clubs in the Austro-Hungarian Empire. Three years later, in 1900, the champions of Belgium, Netherlands and Switzerland, which were the only existing leagues in continental Europe at the time, participated in the Coupe Van der Straeten Ponthoz, thus being dubbed as the "club championship of the continent" by the local newspapers. 

The Mitropa Cup, a competition modelled after the Challenge Cup, was created in 1927, an idea of Austrian Hugo Meisl, and played between Central European clubs. In 1930, the Coupe des Nations, the first attempt to create a cup for national champion clubs of Europe, was played and organised by Swiss club Servette. Held in Geneva, it brought together ten champions from across the continent. The tournament was won by Újpest of Hungary. Latin European nations came together to form the Latin Cup in 1949.

After receiving reports from his journalists over the highly successful South American Championship of Champions of 1948, Gabriel Hanot, editor of L'Équipe, began proposing the creation of a continent-wide tournament. In interviews, Jacques Ferran (one of the founders of the European Champions Cup, together with Gabriel Hanot), said that the South American Championship of Champions was the inspiration for the European Champions Cup. After Stan Cullis declared Wolverhampton Wanderers "Champions of the World" following a successful run of friendlies in the 1950s, in particular a 3–2 friendly victory against Budapest Honvéd, Hanot finally managed to convince UEFA to put into practice such a tournament. It was conceived in Paris in 1955 as the European Champion Clubs' Cup.

1955–1967: Beginnings

The first European Cup took place during the 1955–56 season. Sixteen teams participated (some by invitation): Milan (Italy), AGF Aarhus (Denmark), Anderlecht (Belgium), Djurgården (Sweden), Gwardia Warszawa (Poland), Hibernian (Scotland), Partizan (Yugoslavia), PSV Eindhoven (Netherlands), Rapid Wien (Austria), Real Madrid (Spain), Rot-Weiss Essen (West Germany), Saarbrücken (Saar), Servette (Switzerland), Sporting CP (Portugal), Stade de Reims (France), and Vörös Lobogó (Hungary). 

The first European Cup match took place on 4 September 1955, and ended in a 3–3 draw between Sporting CP and Partizan. The first goal in European Cup history was scored by João Baptista Martins of Sporting CP. The inaugural final took place at the Parc des Princes between Stade de Reims and Real Madrid on 13 June 1956. The Spanish squad came back from behind to win 4–3 thanks to goals from Alfredo Di Stéfano and Marquitos, as well as two goals from Héctor Rial. Real Madrid successfully defended the trophy next season in their home stadium, the Santiago Bernabéu, against Fiorentina. After a scoreless first half, Real Madrid scored twice in six minutes to defeat the Italians. In 1958, Milan failed to capitalise after going ahead on the scoreline twice, only for Real Madrid to equalise. The final, held in Heysel Stadium, went to extra time where Francisco Gento scored the game-winning goal to allow Real Madrid to retain the title for the third consecutive season. 

In a rematch of the first final, Real Madrid faced Stade Reims at the Neckarstadion for the 1959 final, and won 2–0. West German side Eintracht Frankfurt became the first team not to compete in the Latin cup to reach the European Cup final. The 1960 final holds the record for the most goals scored, with Real Madrid beating Eintracht Frankfurt 7–3 in Hampden Park, courtesy of four goals by Ferenc Puskás and a hat-trick by Alfredo Di Stéfano. This was Real Madrid's fifth consecutive title, a record that still stands today.

Real Madrid's reign ended in the 1960–61 season when bitter rivals Barcelona dethroned them in the first round. Barcelona were defeated in the final by Portuguese side Benfica 3–2 at Wankdorf Stadium. Reinforced by Eusébio, Benfica defeated Real Madrid 5–3 at the Olympic Stadium in Amsterdam and kept the title for a second consecutive season. Benfica wanted to repeat Real Madrid's successful run of the 1950s after reaching the showpiece event of the 1962–63 European Cup, but a brace from Brazilian-Italian José Altafini at the Wembley Stadium gave the spoils to Milan, making the trophy leave the Iberian Peninsula for the first time ever. 

Inter Milan beat an ageing Real Madrid 3–1 in the Ernst-Happel-Stadion to win the 1963–64 season and replicate their local-rival's success. The title stayed in Milan for the third year in a row after Inter beat Benfica 1–0 at their home ground, the San Siro. Under the leadership of Jock Stein, Scottish club Celtic beat Inter Milan 2–1 in the 1967 final to become the first British club to win the European Cup. The Celtic players that day, all of whom were born within  of Glasgow, subsequently became known as the "Lisbon Lions".

1968–1978

The 1967–68 season saw Manchester United become the first English team to win the European Cup, beating two-times winners Benfica 4–1 in the final. This final came 10 years after the Munich air disaster, which had claimed the lives of eight United players and left their manager, Matt Busby, fighting for his life. In the 1968–69 season, Ajax became the first Dutch team to reach the European Cup final, but they were beaten 4–1 by Milan, who claimed their second European Cup, with Pierino Prati scoring a hat-trick.

The 1969–70 season saw the first Dutch winners of the competition. Feyenoord knocked out the defending champions, Milan in the second round, before beating Celtic in the final. In the 1970–71 season Ajax won the title, beating Greek side Panathinaikos in the final. the season saw a number of changes, with penalty shoot-outs being introduced, and the away goals rule being changed so that it would be used in all rounds except the final. It was also the first time a Greek team reached the final, as well as the first season that Real Madrid failed to qualify, having finished sixth in La Liga the previous season. Ajax went on to win the competition three years in row (1971 to 1973), which Bayern Munich emulated from 1974 to 1976, before Liverpool won their first two titles in 1977 and 1978.

Anthem

The UEFA Champions League anthem, officially titled simply as "Champions League", was written by Tony Britten, and is an adaptation of George Frideric Handel's 1727 anthem Zadok the Priest (one of his Coronation Anthems). UEFA commissioned Britten in 1992 to arrange an anthem, and the piece was performed by London's Royal Philharmonic Orchestra and sung by the Academy of St. Martin in the Fields. Stating that "the anthem is now almost as iconic as the trophy", UEFA's official website adds it is "known to set the hearts of many of the world's top footballers aflutter".

The chorus contains the three official languages used by UEFA: English, German, and French. The climactic moment is set to the exclamations ‘Die Meister! Die Besten! Les Grandes Équipes! The Champions!’. The anthem's chorus is played before each UEFA Champions League game as the two teams are lined up, as well as at the beginning and end of television broadcasts of the matches. In addition to the anthem, there is also entrance music, which contains parts of the anthem itself, which is played as teams enter the field. The complete anthem is about three minutes long, and has two short verses and the chorus.

Special vocal versions have been performed live at the Champions League final with lyrics in other languages, changing over to the host nation's language for the chorus. These versions were performed by Andrea Bocelli (Italian) (Rome 2009, Milan 2016 and Cardiff 2017), Juan Diego Flores (Spanish) (Madrid 2010), All Angels (Wembley 2011), Jonas Kaufmann and David Garrett (Munich 2012), and Mariza (Lisbon 2014). In the 2013 final at Wembley Stadium, the chorus was played twice. In the 2018 and 2019 finals, held in Kyiv and Madrid respectively, the instrumental version of the chorus was played, by 2Cellos (2018) and Asturia Girls (2019). The anthem has been released commercially in its original version on iTunes and Spotify with the title of Champions League Theme. In 2018, composer Hans Zimmer remixed the anthem with rapper Vince Staples for EA Sports' video game FIFA 19, with it also featuring in the game's reveal trailer.

Branding

In 1991, UEFA asked its commercial partner, Television Event and Media Marketing (TEAM), to help brand the Champions League. This resulted in the anthem, "house colours" of black and white or silver and a logo, and the "starball". The starball was created by Design Bridge, a London-based firm selected by TEAM after a competition. TEAM gives particular attention to detail in how the colours and starball are depicted at matches. According to TEAM, "Irrespective of whether you are a spectator in Moscow or Milan, you will always see the same stadium dressing materials, the same opening ceremony featuring the 'starball' centre circle ceremony, and hear the same UEFA Champions League Anthem". Based on research it conducted, TEAM concluded that by 1999, "the starball logo had achieved a recognition rate of 94 percent among fans".

Format

Qualification

The UEFA Champions League begins with a double round-robin group stage of 32 teams, which since the 2009–10 season is preceded by two qualification 'streams' for teams that do not receive direct entry to the tournament proper. The two streams are divided between teams qualified by virtue of being league champions, and those qualified by virtue of finishing second or third in their national championship.

The number of teams that each association enters into the UEFA Champions League is based upon the UEFA coefficients of the member associations. These coefficients are generated by the results of clubs representing each association during the previous five Champions League and UEFA Cup/Europa League seasons. The higher an association's coefficient, the more teams represent the association in the Champions League, and the fewer qualification rounds the association's teams must compete in.

Four of the remaining six qualifying places are granted to the winners of a six-round qualifying tournament between the remaining 43 or 44 national champions, within which those champions from associations with higher coefficients receive byes to later rounds. The other two are granted to the winners of a three-round qualifying tournament between 10–11 clubs from the associations ranked 5–6 through 15, which have qualified based upon finishing second or third in their respective national league.

In addition to sporting criteria, any club must be licensed by its national association to participate in the Champions League. To obtain a license, the club must meet certain stadium, infrastructure and finance requirements.

In 2005–06, Liverpool and Artmedia Bratislava became the first teams to reach the Champions League group stage after playing in all three qualifying rounds. Real Madrid and Barcelona hold the record for the most appearances in the group stage, having qualified 25 times, followed by FC Porto and Bayern Munich on 24.

Between 1999 and 2008, no differentiation was made between champions and non-champions in qualification. The 16 top-ranked teams spread across the biggest domestic leagues qualified directly for the tournament group stage. Prior to this, three preliminary knockout qualifying rounds whittled down the remaining teams, with teams starting in different rounds.

An exception to the usual European qualification system happened in 2005, after Liverpool won the Champions League the year before, but did not finish in a Champions League qualification place in the Premier League that season. UEFA gave special dispensation for Liverpool to enter the Champions League, giving England five qualifiers. UEFA subsequently ruled that the defending champions qualify for the competition the following year regardless of their domestic league placing. However, for those leagues with four entrants in the Champions League, this meant that, if the Champions League winner fell outside of its domestic league's top four, it would qualify at the expense of the fourth-placed team in the league. Until 2015–16, no association could have more than four entrants in the Champions League. In May 2012, Tottenham Hotspur finished fourth in the 2011–12 Premier League, two places ahead of Chelsea, but failed to qualify for the 2012–13 Champions League, after Chelsea won the 2012 final. Tottenham were demoted to the 2012–13 UEFA Europa League.

In May 2013, it was decided that, starting from the 2015–16 season (and continuing at least for the three-year cycle until the 2017–18 season), the winners of the previous season's UEFA Europa League would qualify for the UEFA Champions League, entering at least the play-off round, and entering the group stage if the berth reserved for the Champions League title holders was not used. The previous limit of a maximum of four teams per association was increased to five, meaning that a fourth-placed team from one of the top three ranked associations would only have to be moved to the Europa League if both the Champions League and Europa League winners came from that association and both finished outside the top four of their domestic league.

In 2007, Michel Platini, the UEFA president, had proposed taking one place from the three leagues with four entrants and allocating it to that nation's cup winners. This proposal was rejected in a vote at a UEFA Strategy Council meeting. In the same meeting, however, it was agreed that the third-placed team in the top three leagues would receive automatic qualification for the group stage, rather than entry into the third qualifying round, while the fourth-placed team would enter the play-off round for non-champions, guaranteeing an opponent from one of the top 15 leagues in Europe. This was part of Platini's plan to increase the number of teams qualifying directly into the group stage, while simultaneously increasing the number of teams from lower-ranked nations in the group stage.

In 2012, Arsène Wenger referred to qualifying for the Champions League by finishing in the top four places in the English Premier League as the "4th Place Trophy". The phrase was coined after a pre-match conference when he was questioned about Arsenal's lack of a trophy after exiting the FA Cup. He said "The first trophy is to finish in the top four". At Arsenal's 2012 AGM, Wenger was also quoted as saying: "For me there are five trophies every season: Premier League, Champions League, the third is to qualify for the Champions League..."

Group stage and knockout phase

The tournament proper begins with a group stage of 32 teams, divided into eight groups of four. The draw to determine which teams go into each group is seeded based on teams' performance in UEFA competitions, and no group may contain more than one club from each nation. Each team plays six group stage games, meeting the other three teams in its group home and away in a round-robin format. The winning team and the runners-up from each group then progress to the next round. The third-placed team enters the UEFA Europa League.

For the next stage – the last 16 – the winning team from one group plays against the runners-up from another group, and teams from the same association may not be drawn against each other. From the quarter-finals onwards, the draw is entirely random, without association protection.

The group stage is played from September to December, whilst the knock-out stage starts in February. The knock-out ties are played in a two-legged format, with the exception of the final. The final is typically held in the last two weeks of May, or in the early days of June, which has happened in three consecutive odd-numbered years since 2015. In the 2019–20 season, due to the COVID-19 pandemic the tournament was suspended for five months. The format of the remainder of the tournament was temporarily amended as a result, with the quarter-finals and semi-finals being played as single match knockout ties at neutral venues in Lisbon, Portugal in the summer with the final taking place on 23 August.

Distribution
The following is the default access list.

Changes will be made to the access list above if the Champions League or Europa League title holders qualify for the tournament via their domestic leagues.
 If the Champions League title holders qualify for the group stage via their domestic league, the champions of association 11 enters the group stage, and champions of the highest-ranked associations in earlier rounds are also promoted accordingly.
 If the Europa League title holders qualify for the group stage via their domestic league, the third-placed team of association 5 enter the group stage, and runners-up of the highest-ranked associations in the second qualifying round are also promoted accordingly.
 If the Champions League or Europa League title holders qualify for the qualifying rounds via their domestic league, their spot in the qualifying rounds is vacated, and teams of the highest-ranked associations in earlier rounds are promoted accordingly.
 An association may have a maximum of five teams in the Champions League. Therefore, if both the Champions League and Europa League title holders come from the same top-four association and finish outside of the top four of their domestic league, the fourth-placed team of the league will not compete in the Champions League and will instead compete in the Europa League.

Prizes

Trophy and medals

Each year, the winning team is presented with the European Champion Clubs' Cup, the current version of which has been awarded since 1967. From the 1968–69 season and prior to the 2008–09 season any team that won the Champions League three years in a row or five times overall was awarded the official trophy permanently. Each time a club achieved this, a new official trophy had to be forged for the following season. Five clubs own a version of the official trophy: Real Madrid, Ajax, Bayern Munich, Milan and Liverpool. Since 2008, the official trophy has remained with UEFA and the clubs are awarded a replica.

It was designed by Jürg Stadelmann, a jeweller from Bern, Switzerland, after the original was given to Real Madrid in 1966 in recognition of their six titles to date, and cost 10,000 Swiss francs.

As of the 2012–13 season, 40 gold medals are presented to the Champions League winners, and 40 silver medals to the runners-up.

Prize money
As of 2021–22, the fixed amount of prize money paid to participating clubs is as follows.
 Play-off round: €5,000,000
 Base fee for group stage: €15,640,000
 Group match victory: €2,800,000
 Group match draw: €900,000
 Round of 16: €9,600,000
 Quarter-finals: €10,600,000
 Semi-finals: €12,500,000
 Runners-up: €15,500,000
 Champions: €20,000,000

This means that, at best, a club can earn €85,140,000 of prize money under this structure, not counting shares of the qualifying rounds, play-off round or the market pool.

A large part of the distributed revenue from the UEFA Champions League is linked to the "market pool", the distribution of which is determined by the value of the television market in each nation. For the 2019–20 season, Paris Saint-Germain, who were the runners-up, earned nearly €126.8 million in total, of which €101.3 million was prize money, compared with the €125.46 million earned by Bayern Munich, who won the tournament and were awarded €112.96 million in prize money.

Sponsorship

Like the FIFA World Cup, the UEFA Champions League is sponsored by a group of multinational corporations, in contrast to the single main sponsor typically found in national top-flight leagues. When the Champions League was created in 1992, it was decided that a maximum of eight companies should be allowed to sponsor the event, with each corporation being allocated four advertising boards around the perimeter of the pitch, as well as logo placement at pre- and post-match interviews and a certain number of tickets to each match. This, combined with a deal to ensure tournament sponsors were given priority on television advertisements during matches, ensured that each of the tournament's main sponsors was given maximum exposure.

From the 2012–13 knockout phase, UEFA used LED advertising hoardings installed in knock-out participant stadiums, including the final stage. From the 2015–16 season onwards, UEFA has used such hoardings from the play-off round until the final.

The tournament's main sponsors for the 2021–24 cycle are:
 Oppo
 FedEx
 Turkish Airlines
 Heineken N.V.
 Heineken (except Albania, Azerbaijan, Bosnia and Herzegovina, France, Kazakhstan, Kosovo, Norway and Turkey)
 Heineken Silver
 Just Eat Takeaway
 10bis (Israel only)
 Menulog (Australasia only)
 Bistro (Slovakia only)
 Just Eat 
 Denmark
 France
 Ireland
 Italy
 Spain
 Switzerland
 United Kingdom
 Lieferando (Germany and Austria only)
 Pyszne (Poland only)
 Grubhub and Seamless (United States only)
 SkipTheDishes (Canada only)
 Takeaway (Belgium, Bulgaria and Luxembourg only)
 Thuisbezorgd (Netherlands only)
 Mastercard
 PepsiCo
 Pepsi 
 Pepsi Max
 Gatorade
 Lay's (except Australasia, Balkan states, Turkey, Ireland and the United Kingdom)
 Smith's (Australasia only)
 Walkers (United Kingdom and Ireland only) 
 Ruffles (Turkey only) 
 Chipsy (Croatia, Albania, Serbia, Montenegro, Bosnia and Herzegovina, Kosovo and North Macedonia only)
 Rockstar
 Sony
 PlayStation 5
 Socios.com (United States only)
Adidas is a secondary sponsor and supplies the official match ball, the Adidas Finale, and Macron supplies the referees' kit. Hublot is also a secondary sponsor as the official fourth official board of the competition.

Individual clubs may wear jerseys with advertising. However, only two sponsorships are permitted per jersey in addition to that of the kit manufacturer, at the chest and the left sleeve. Exceptions are made for non-profit organisations, which can feature on the front of the shirt, incorporated with the main sponsor or in place of it; or on the back, either below the squad number or on the collar area.

If a club plays a match in a nation where the relevant sponsorship category is restricted (such as France's alcohol advertising restriction), then they must remove that logo from their jerseys. For example, when Rangers played French side Auxerre in the 1996–97 Champions League, they wore the logo of Center Parcs instead of McEwan's Lager (both companies at the time were subsidiaries of Scottish & Newcastle).

Media coverage

The competition attracts an extensive television audience, not just in Europe, but throughout the world. The final of the tournament has been, in recent years, the most-watched annual sporting event in the world. The final of the 2012–13 tournament had the competition's highest TV ratings to date, drawing approximately 360 million television viewers.

Team records and statistics

Performances by club

Performances by nation

Notes

Player records

Most wins

Most appearances

Most goals

Awards
Starting from the 2021–22 edition, UEFA introduced the UEFA Champions League Player of the Season award.

The jury is composed of the coaches of the clubs that participated in the group stage of the competition, as well as 55 journalists selected by the European Sports Media (ESM) group, one from each UEFA member association.

Winners

In the same season, UEFA also introduced the UEFA Champions League Young Player of the Season award.

Winners

See also

 Continental football championships
 List of association football competitions

References

External links

  

 
Champions League
1955 establishments in Europe
1
Multi-national professional sports leagues
Sports leagues established in 1955
Association football events